Civenna (locally Sciuvenna ) is a frazione of the comune (municipality) of Bellagio in the Province of Como in the Italian region of Lombardy, located about  north of Milan and about  northeast of Como.  It was an independent commune until 21 January 2014. In 2010 it had some 720 inhabitants.

References

Cities and towns in Lombardy